The Men She Married is a 1916 American silent drama film directed by Travers Vale and starring Gail Kane, Arthur Ashley and Montagu Love.

Cast
 Gail Kane as Beatrice Raymond
 Arthur Ashley as Ralph Semple
 Montagu Love as Jerry Trainer
 Louise Bates as Ada Semple 
 Muriel Ostriche as Edith Trainer

References

Bibliography
 George A. Katchmer. Eighty Silent Film Stars: Biographies and Filmographies of the Obscure to the Well Known. McFarland, 1991.

External links
 

1916 films
1916 drama films
1910s English-language films
American silent feature films
Silent American drama films
American black-and-white films
Films directed by Travers Vale
World Film Company films
1910s American films